Kijabe is a town in Kenya.

Etymology
The name Kijabe likely derives from the Maasai 'Donyo Kejabe' meaning 'Gold mountain'.as many would think,kijabe was never discovered by white people

Description

It stands on the edge of the Great Rift Valley at an altitude of 2200m, some 50 kilometres north-west of Nairobi. Kijabe is located in the sub-county of Lari, Kiambu County. Kijabe has a population 2,026 in 2019. Kijabe has a railway station along the Uganda Railway. The town is located between Limuru and Naivasha.

There are actually two places called Kijabe.  Kijabe Town is located approximately 2 km north-west of Kijabe Mission Station.  Kijabe Town is the closest settlement to the Railway Station of the same name and is a community of small land holders. Kijabe mission station is the home of Kijabe Hospital, AIC-CURE International
Children's Hospital of Kenya, Moffatt Bible College, Kijabe Youth Charity initiative, a group that helps the less privileged in the society, and Rift Valley Academy, a school for children of missionaries established in 1906 and Kijabe Guesthouse.

History
Kijabe is a town in the lands of the Maasai peoples. During British colonial times, it served a mission station. However in recent times, it has been turned into a medical community.

References

External links 
http://www.kijabe.org
https://web.archive.org/web/20110725095331/http://www.kijabeguesthouse.org/

Kiambu County
Populated places in Central Province (Kenya)